Dennis Mugo is a Kenyan actor, popularly  known as OJ.

Career 
He began acting in the high-school television series Tahidi High. He was also part of the Tahidi High technical team and assistant director. He acted as a bad boy. 

He works for the Embu County Government in the Department of Youth Empowerment and Sports. He is in charge of Talent Academy and conduct the entire facility. He works alongside Tahidi High actor Immaculate Murugi, popularly known as Ashley, in the academy.

References 

Year of birth missing (living people)
Living people